Kačergiai is a village in Kėdainiai district municipality, in Kaunas County, in central Lithuania. According to the 2011 census, the village was uninhabited. It is the northern part of Kačergiai village in Kaunas District Municipality.

Demography

References

Villages in Kaunas County
Kėdainiai District Municipality